Dietrich of Anhalt-Dessau (b. Dessau, 2 August 1702 - d. Dessau, 2 December 1769), was a German prince of the House of Ascania and later regent of the principality of Anhalt-Dessau. He was also a Prussian Generalfeldmarschall.

Dietrich was the third son of Leopold I, Prince of Anhalt-Dessau, by his morganatic wife Anna Louise Föhse.

Life
The introduction of primogeniture in Anhalt-Dessau in 1727 left Dietrich without any chance to take part in the government of Dessau. Because his oldest brother, the Hereditary Prince William Gustav, had already died before his father, the second brother, Leopold Maximilian, inherited the princely title and government. After the latter's death in 1751, the succession passed to his eleven-year-old son Leopold Frederick Franz. Dietrich acted as regent of Anhalt-Dessau on behalf of his nephew until 1758, when Leopold Frederick Franz was proclaimed an adult and assumed the government of his principality.

Dietrich never married or had children. Later, his palace in Dessau was used by a progressive school, "The Philanthropinum".

References

 

1702 births
1769 deaths
Dietrich
Field marshals of Prussia
18th-century Prussian military personnel
Royal reburials
People from Dessau-Roßlau
Military personnel from Saxony-Anhalt
Sons of monarchs